Where Trails Divide is a 1937 American Western film directed by Robert N. Bradbury and starring Tom Keene, Warner Richmond and Eleanor Stewart.

Cast

References

Bibliography
James Robert Parish & Michael R. Pitts. Film directors: a guide to their American films. Scarecrow Press, 1974.

External links
 

1937 films
1937 Western (genre) films
1930s English-language films
American Western (genre) films
Films directed by Robert N. Bradbury
Monogram Pictures films
1930s American films